Phaparbari is a village development committee in Makwanpur District in the Narayani Zone of southern Nepal. At the time of the 1991 Nepal census it had a population of 13,063 people living in 2119 individual households.

now Bagmati nagarpalika

References

Populated places in Makwanpur District

Hereditarianism